Carl Fletcher may refer to:
 Carl Fletcher (Welsh footballer) (born 1980), Welsh former footballer and manager
 Carl Fletcher (Canadian soccer) (born 1971), former professional Canadian soccer defender

See also
 Karl Fletcher, fictional character in TV series Dream Team